Jasabhai Barad is an Indian politician. He was elected to the Gujarat Legislative Assembly from Somnath in the 2012 Gujarat Legislative Assembly election as a member of the Indian National Congress then again in Gujarat Assembly By Election, 2014 as a member of the Bharatiya Janata Party. He was sworn as Minister of State for Agriculture, Civil aviation in Anandiben Patel cabinet in 2014.

References

Living people
State cabinet ministers of Gujarat
People from Gir Somnath district
1949 births
Gujarat MLAs 2012–2017
Rashtriya Janata Party politicians
Indian National Congress politicians from Gujarat
Bharatiya Janata Party politicians from Gujarat